Tom Hemingway (born 6 December 1986) is an English former professional rugby league footballer who played as a  and  in the 2000s and 2010s. 

He played for the Batley Bulldogs in the Betfred Championship.

Background
Hemingway was born in Dewsbury, West Yorkshire, England.

Career
He started out with Super League side Huddersfield Giants before going on loan to the Batley Bulldogs.

Tom joined Blackpool Panthers ahead of the 2010 season and made an impressive start at scrum-half for the Championship One promotion hopefuls.

On 21 June 2019 Hemingway announced his retirement through injury

References

External links

Profile at featherstonerovers.net
Giants Official Player Profile

1986 births
Living people
Batley Bulldogs players
Blackpool Panthers players
Dewsbury Rams players
English rugby league players
Featherstone Rovers players
Halifax R.L.F.C. players
Huddersfield Giants players
Leigh Leopards players
Rugby league five-eighths
Rugby league halfbacks
Rugby league hookers
Rugby league players from Dewsbury
Whitehaven R.L.F.C. players